The Liouguei Tunnels are six tunnels in Liouguei District, Kaohsiung, Taiwan.

History
The tunnels were originally constructed during the Japanese rule of Taiwan during the road construction in 1936 to facilitate the transportation of Camphor and logs from the region. The tunnels were later abandoned in 1992 after the completion of Provincial Highway 27A. In September 2017, the Forestry Bureau reopened three tunnels to visitors.

Ecology
The tunnels are currently inhabited by bats and swallows.

Technical specifications
The tunnels have a total combined length of 792 meters.

See also
 List of tourist attractions in Taiwan

References

1936 establishments in Taiwan
Tunnels completed in 1936
Tunnels in Kaohsiung